Battles of Napoleon is a 1988 computer wargame by Chuck Kroegel and David Landrey published by Strategic Simulations. It was released for the Apple II, Commodore 64, and DOS.

Scenario disks
Designer David Landrey received permission from SSI to release expansion packs for Battles of Napoleon and, in 1994, the game itself from his company, Novastar Games.

Scenario disk #1
 Austerlitz
 Marengo
 Utitsa
 Redoubt

Scenario disk #2
 Albuera
 Medellin
 Bridge Battle
 Santon
 New Orleans

Scenario disk #3
 Camden
 Cowpens
 Kings Mountain
 Hobkirk
 Eutaw Springs

Scenario disk #4
 Wagram
 Smolensk
 Eylau
 Plancenoit
 Bladensburg
 The Hill
 Waterloo (variant)
 Leipzig (variant)

Scenario disk #5
 Leipzig (variant)
 Quatre Bras (variant)
 Vimiero
 Aspern-Essling
 Podubno
 Village
 Retreat
 Ligny

Scenario disk #6
 Pyramids
 Raab
 Craonne
 Corunna
 Borodino (variant)
 North
 Jena
 Wavre

Reception
Battles of Napoleon sold under 10,000 copies. Computer Gaming World gave it a glowing review, calling it "the game that can keep you satisfied, even addicted, for many years to come." The magazine in 1989 named it Wargame of the Year, in 1990 gave the game five out of five stars, in 1993 gave it three-plus stars, stating that "its play value and historical accuracy mandated its acquisition for anyone interested in the period". and in 1994 stated that the game "far outshines any Napoleonic game released since", with "a veritable cult following".

In 1996, Computer Gaming World declared Battles of Napoleon the 91st-best computer game ever released. The magazine's wargame columnist Terry Coleman named it his pick for the seventh-best computer wargame released by late 1996.

References

External links
 

1988 video games
Apple II games
Commodore 64 games
Computer wargames
DOS games
Napoleonic Wars video games
Strategic Simulations games
Video games developed in the United States